Carlos Roberto de Oliveira (13 April 1954 – 8 January 2023), known as Roberto Dinamite, was a Brazilian footballer and politician. He was born in Duque de Caxias, Rio de Janeiro state. With a career as centre forward spanning over twenty years, Roberto is Vasco da Gama's player with the most appearances and all-time top goalscorer, as well as the overall leading scorer in the Brazilian Série A and the Rio de Janeiro State Championship. At the national level, Roberto Dinamite played in the 1978 and 1982 FIFA World Cups and the 1972 Olympic Games. He was president of Vasco da Gama from 2008 to 2014.

Club career
Roberto Dinamite was developed at Vasco da Gama youth squad. He is one of the most famous Vasco da Gama players, and is the club's greatest goal scorer. He scored 698 goals wearing the club's shirt and 864 goals in all his career. He played 1022 matches (768 official matches, and 254 friendly matches).

Dinamite was nicknamed Dinamite by the journalist Aparício Pires, of Jornal dos Sports newspaper, after scoring a spectacular goal in his debut for the professional team, on 25 November 1971, against Internacional, at Maracanã stadium. The journalist wrote in the newspaper that the Dynamite-Boy detonates at Maracanã.

He helped Vasco da Gama win the 1974 Campeonato Brasileiro Série A and the 1977 Campeonato Carioca before moving to Barcelona in 1979. After only scoring 3 goals at Barcelona, he returned back to Vasco da Gama and won four more Campeonato Carioca (1982, 1987, 1988, 1992)

In 1989 and 1990, he played for Portuguesa of São Paulo state, scoring 11 goals.

His last goal was scored on 26 October 1992, when, in Campeonato Carioca, Vasco da Gama beat Goytacaz 2–0 at São Januário Stadium.

Dinamite retired on 24 March 1993, when he was 39 years old. His last match was on that day, when Deportivo de La Coruña of Spain beat Vasco da Gama 2–0 at Maracanã stadium, in a friendly game in which Zico also played (for Vasco).

International career
Roberto Dinamite earned 47 caps with the Brazil national team, between September 1975 and June 1984, scoring 25 goals, including matches against combined teams, and clubs. He played 38 matches against national teams (20 of them were official FIFA matches), and scored 20 goals, and the nine other matches were against combined teams, and clubs, scoring five goals in those matches. His first national team match was played on 30 September 1975, when the Peru national team beat Brazil 3–1. Roberto Dinamite's first Brazil national team goal was scored on 23 May 1976, when Brazil beat England 1–0. His last cap was earned on 17 June 1984, when Brazil and Argentina drew 0–0.

Dinamite was a reserve player in the 1978 FIFA World Cup, scoring three goals. He was also reserve player for Serginho in the 1982 FIFA World Cup, and was called by Telê Santana after Careca got injured.

Roberto Dinamite played five Brazil Olympic team matches, all of them in 1972. He scored one goal in his last match, played on 11 August 1972, when Brazil and Tuna Luso drew 1–1.

Politics
After his retirement from football, he became a politician. In 1992, after joining the PSDB party, he ran for the State Assembly of Rio de Janeiro, being elected with 34,893 votes, and being re-elected twice since.

As a member of PMDB, Roberto Dinamite was elected Rio de Janeiro state deputy in 1994, with 68,516 votes, in 1998, with 44,993 votes, in 2002, with 53,172 votes and in 2006, with 49,097 votes. He was a member of PMDB party.

Roberto Dinamite was a candidate to Vasco da Gama presidency in 2003 and in 2006. He was elected president of Vasco da Gama on 21 June 2008.

Death
Roberto Dinamite died of intestinal cancer in Rio de Janeiro on 8 January 2023, at the age of 68, after fighting against the disease since 2021.

Career statistics

Club

Honours
Vasco da Gama
Campeonato Brasileiro Série A: 1974
Campeonato Carioca: 1977, 1982, 1987, 1988, 1992

Individual
Vasco da Gama all-time top goalscorer: 502 goals
Campeonato Brasileiro Série A all-time top goalscorer: 190 goals
Campeonato Carioca all-time top goalscorer: 284 goals
42nd-highest official goalscorer in football history: 517 goals (according to RSSSF)
Campeonato Brasileiro Série A top scorer: 1974 (16 goals), 1984 (16 goals)
Campeonato Carioca top scorer: 1978 (19 goals), 1981 (31 goals), 1985 (12 goals)
Bola de Prata: 1979, 1981, 1984
Copa América top scorer: 1983 (3 goals)
Maior Ídolo do Rio (Rio's Greatest Idol) by Jornal dos Sports newspaper: 1985
Craque do Brasil (Outstanding player of Brazil) by Jornal dos Sports newspaper: 1985

See also 
 List of men's footballers with 500 or more goals

References

External links

Official Website

1954 births
2023 deaths 
Deaths from colorectal cancer 
Deaths from cancer in Rio de Janeiro (state)
Brazilian footballers
Brazilian expatriate footballers
Brazilian football chairmen and investors
FC Barcelona players
Campo Grande Atlético Clube players
Associação Portuguesa de Desportos players
CR Vasco da Gama players
La Liga players
Expatriate footballers in Spain
Brazilian expatriate sportspeople in Spain
Campeonato Brasileiro Série A players
Olympic footballers of Brazil
Footballers at the 1972 Summer Olympics
1975 Copa América players
1979 Copa América players
1978 FIFA World Cup players
1982 FIFA World Cup players
1983 Copa América players
Brazil international footballers
Brazilian sportsperson-politicians
Brazilian Social Democracy Party politicians
Brazilian Democratic Movement politicians
People from Duque de Caxias, Rio de Janeiro
Members of the Legislative Assembly of Rio de Janeiro
Association football forwards
Sportspeople from Rio de Janeiro (state)